The Cupsuptic River is a  river in Maine. It flows from its source near the Canada–United States border to Cupsuptic Lake, the northern arm of Mooselookmeguntic Lake, which drains via other lakes into the Androscoggin River. Although short, the Cupsuptic River includes three of the highest mountains of New England — Kennebago Divide, Snow Mountain, and White Cap Mountain — within its watershed. The name "Cupsuptic" derives from the Abenaki language, meaning "a closed-up stream."

See also
List of rivers of Maine

References

Maine Streamflow Data from the USGS
Maine Watershed Data From Environmental Protection Agency
Native American Placenames of the United States (University of Oklahoma, 2004) by William Bright

Tributaries of the Kennebec River
Rivers of Oxford County, Maine
Rivers of Maine